Anthony Joseph "Siki" Gardella (October 15, 1895 – December 26, 1974) was an American football fullback for the Green Bay Packers of the National Football League (NFL).

Biography
Gardella was born on October 15, 1895 in Worcester, Massachusetts. He died there in 1974.

See also
List of Green Bay Packers players

References

1895 births
1974 deaths
Players of American football from New York City
Green Bay Packers players
American football fullbacks